Dame Gracie Fields  (born Grace Stansfield; 9 January 189827 September 1979) was an English actress, singer, comedian and star of cinema and music hall who was one of the top ten film stars in Britain during the 1930s and was considered the highest paid film star in the world in 1937. She was known affectionately as Our Gracie and the Lancashire Lass and for never losing her strong, native Lancashire accent. She was appointed a Commander of the Order of the British Empire (CBE) and an Officer of the Venerable Order of St John (OStJ) in 1938, and a Dame Commander of the Order of the British Empire (DBE) in 1979.

Life and work

Early life
Fields was born Grace Stansfield, a daughter of Frederick Stansfield (1874–1956) and his wife Sarah Jane 'Jenny' Stansfield née Bamford (1879–1953), over a fish and chip shop owned by her grandmother, Sarah Bamford, in Molesworth Street, Rochdale, Lancashire. Her great-grandfather, William Stansfield (b.1805), of Hebden Bridge, Yorkshire, was a descendant of the Stansfield family of Stansfield, Yorkshire.

Fields made her first stage appearance as a child, in 1905, joining children's repertory theatre groups such as "Haley's Garden of Girls" and the "Nine Dainty Dots". Her two sisters, Edith Fields and Betty Fields, and brother, Tommy Fields, all went on to appear on stage, but Gracie was the most successful. Her professional debut in variety took place at the Rochdale Hippodrome theatre in 1910, and she soon gave up her job in the local cotton mill, where she was a half-timer, spending half a week in the mill and the other half at school. Early newspaper clippings show her appearing locally in venues such as Todmorden (December 1913), Milnrow (February 1914), and Burnley (July 1914) with an appearance at The Palace in Blackpool in April 1914. The Burnley newspaper described her as “The Girl with the Double Voice”.

Fields met the comedian and impresario Archie Pitt and they began working together. Pitt gave Fields champagne on her 18th birthday, and wrote in an autograph book to her that he would make her a star. Pitt began to manage her career and they began a relationship; they married in 1923 at Clapham Register Office. Their first revue was called Yes I Think So in 1915, and the two continued to tour Britain together until 1924. That year they appeared in the revue Mr Tower of London, with other shows following in subsequent years, such as By Request, It's A Bargain and The Show's The Thing.

Pitt was the brother of Bert Aza, founder of the Aza Agency, which was responsible for many entertainers of the day including the actor and comedian Stanley Holloway, who was introduced to Aza by Fields. Fields and Holloway first worked together on her film Sing As We Go in 1934 and the two remained close friends for the rest of their lives.

Fame

Fields came to major public notice in Mr Tower of London, a show staged in London's West End. Her career accelerated from this point, with dramatic performances and the beginning of a recording career on His Master's Voice (HMV). She was one of the most successful recording artists at the label, her first record, My Blue Heaven sold 500,000 copies in 1928. In 1933, HMV produced the four millionth Fields record, which was pressed by the singer herself on camera.

At one point, Fields was playing three shows a night in the West End. She appeared in the Pitt production SOS with Gerald Du Maurier, a play staged at the St James's Theatre.

Fields' most famous song, "Sally", which became her theme, was written for her first film, Sally in Our Alley (1931), a major box office hit. She went on to make a number of films, initially in Britain and later in the United States (when she was paid a record fee of £200,000 for four films). Regardless, she never enjoyed performing without a live audience, and found the process of film-making boring. She tried to opt out of filming, before director Monty Banks persuaded her otherwise, landing her a lucrative Hollywood deal. Fields demanded that the four pictures be filmed in Britain and not Hollywood.

The final few lines of the song "Sally", which Fields sang at every performance from 1931 onwards, were written by her husband's mistress, Annie Lipman. Fields claimed in later life that she wanted to "Drown blasted Sally with Walter with the aspidistra on top!", a reference to two other of her well-known songs, "Walter, Walter", and "The Biggest Aspidistra In The World".

The famous opera star Luisa Tetrazzini heard her singing an aria and asked her to sing in grand opera. Fields decided to stay "where I knew I belonged."

Charity work
In the 1930s, her popularity was at its peak, and she was given many honours: she became an Officer of the Venerable Order of St John (OStJ) for her charity work, and a Commander of the Order of the British Empire (CBE) for her services to entertainment in the 1938 New Year Honours, and was granted the Freedom of the Borough of Rochdale in 1937.

She donated her house in The Bishops Avenue, north London – which she had not much cared for, and shared with her husband Pitt and his mistress – to an orphanage after the marriage broke down. In 1939, she became seriously ill with cervical cancer. The public sent over 250,000 goodwill messages and she retired to her villa on Capri. After she recovered, she recorded a special 78rpm record simply called Gracie's Thanks, in which she thanks the public for the many cards and letters she received while in hospital.

Fields also helped Rochdale Association Football Club in the 1930s, when they were struggling to pay fees and buy sports equipment.

In 1933, she set up the Gracie Fields Children's Home and Orphanage at Peacehaven, Sussex, for children of those in the theatre profession who could not look after their children. She kept this until 1967, when the home was no longer needed. This was near her own home in Peacehaven, and Fields often visited, with the children all calling her 'Aunty Grace'.

World War II

In 1939, Fields suffered a breakdown and went to Capri to recuperate.
World War II was declared while she was recovering in Capri, and Fields – still very ill after her cancer surgery – threw herself into her work and signed up for the Entertainments National Service Association (ENSA) headed by her old film producer, Basil Dean. Fields travelled to France to entertain the troops in the midst of air-raids, performing on the backs of open lorries and in war-torn areas.  During the war, she also paid for all servicemen and women to travel free on public transport within the boundaries of Rochdale.

Following her divorce from Archie Pitt, she married Italian-born film director Monty Banks in March 1940. However, because Banks remained an Italian citizen and would have been interned in the United Kingdom after Italy declared war in 1940, she went with him to North America, possibly at the suggestion of Winston Churchill who told her to "Make American Dollars, not British Pounds", which she did, in aid of the Navy League and the Spitfire Fund. She and Banks moved to their home in Santa Monica, California. Fields occasionally returned to Britain, performing in factories and army camps around the country. After their initial argument, Parliament offered her an official apology.

Although she continued to spend much of her time entertaining troops and otherwise supporting the war effort outside Britain, this led to a decline in her popularity at home. She performed many times for Allied troops, travelling as far as New Guinea, where she received an enthusiastic response from Australian personnel. In late 1945, she toured the South Pacific Islands.

Post-war career
After the war, Fields continued her career less actively. She began performing in Britain again in 1948, headlining the London Palladium over Ella Fitzgerald who was also on the bill. The BBC gave her her own radio show in 1947, dubbed Our Gracie's Working Party, in which 12 towns were visited by Fields. It featured a live show of music and entertainment broadcast weekly, compered by Fields, who also performed, with local talents also on the bill. The tour commenced in Gracie's hometown of Rochdale. Like many BBC shows at the time, this show transferred to Radio Luxembourg in 1950, sponsored by Wisk soap powder. Billy Ternent and his Orchestra accompanied her.

In 1951, Fields took part in the cabaret which closed the Festival of Britain celebrations. She proved popular once more, though never regaining the status she enjoyed in the 1930s. She continued recording, but made no more films, moving more towards light classical music as popular tastes changed, often adopting a religious theme. She continued into the new medium of LP records, and recorded new versions of her old favourite songs, as well as contemporary tracks, to 'liven things up a bit'.

Her husband, Monty Banks, died on 8 January 1950 of a heart attack, while travelling on the Orient Express. On 18 February 1952 in Capri, Fields married Boris Alperovici (d.1983), a Romanian radio repairman. She claimed that he was the love of her life, and that she couldn't wait to propose to him. She proposed on Christmas Day in front of friends and family. They married at the Church of St Stefano on Capri in a quiet ceremony, before honeymooning in Rome.

She lived on her beloved Isle of Capri for the remainder of her life, at her home La Canzone Del Mare, a swimming and restaurant complex which Fields' home overlooked. It was favoured by many Hollywood stars during the 1950s, with regular guests including Richard Burton, Elizabeth Taylor, Greta Garbo and Noël Coward.

Later years
Fields began to work less, but still toured the UK under the management of Harold Fielding (manager of top artists of the day such as Tommy Steele and Max Bygraves). Her UK tours proved popular, and in the mid-1960s she gave farewell tours in Australia, Canada and America; the last performance was recorded and released years later.

In 1956, Fields was the first actress to portray Miss Marple on screen, in a US Television (Goodyear Playhouse) production of Agatha Christie's A Murder is Announced. The production featured Jessica Tandy and Roger Moore, and predates the Margaret Rutherford films by five years. She also starred in Television productions of A Tale of Two Cities (DuPont Show of the Month, 1958), The Old Lady Shows Her Medals (United States Steel Hour)– for which she won a Sylvania Award (1956) and received an EMMY Award nomination for Best Single Performance by an Actress (1957) – and Mrs 'Arris Goes to Paris (Studio One), which was remade years later with Angela Lansbury as Mrs Harris, a charwoman in search of a fur coat (or a Christian Dior gown in Lansbury's case).

In 1957, her single "Around the World" peaked at No.8 in the UK Singles Chart, with her recording of "Little Donkey" reaching No.20 in November 1959. The sheet music for the song was the UK's best-seller for seven weeks.

She was the subject of This Is Your Life on 20 March 1960, when she was surprised by Eamonn Andrews at the BBC Television Theatre.

Fields regularly performed in TV appearances, being the first entertainer to perform on Val Parnell's Sunday Night at the London Palladium. Fields had two Christmas TV specials in 1960 and 1961, singing her old favourites and new songs in front of a studio audience. 1971 saw A Gift For Gracie, another TV special presented by Fields and Bruce Forsyth. This followed on from her popularity on Stars on Sunday, a religious programme on Britain's ITV, in which well-known performers sang hymns or read extracts from the Bible. Fields was the most requested artist on the show.

In 1968, Fields headlined a two-week Christmas stint at the West Riding of Yorkshire's prestigious Batley Variety Club. "I was born over a fish and chip shop – I never thought I'd be singing in one!" claimed Fields during the performance recorded by the BBC.

In 1975, her album The Golden Years reached No. 48 in the UK Albums Chart.

In 1978, she opened the Gracie Fields Theatre, near Oulder Hill Leadership Academy in her native Rochdale, performing a concert there recorded by the BBC to open the show. Fields appeared in ten Royal Variety Performances from 1928 onwards, her last being in 1978 at the age of 80, when she appeared as a surprise guest in the finale and sang her theme song, "Sally".

Her final TV appearance came in January 1979 when she appeared in a special octogenarian edition of The Merv Griffin Show in America, in which she sang the song she popularised in America, "The Biggest Aspidistra in the World". Fields was notified by her confidant John Taylor, while she was in America, that she had received the Queen's invitation to become a Dame Commander of the Order of the British Empire (in the 1979 New Years Honours List), to which she replied: "Yes I'll accept, yes I can kneel –  but I might need help getting back up, and yes I'll attend –  as long as they don't call Boris 'Buttons'." Seven months before her death in 1979, she was invested as a Dame Commander of the Order of the British Empire (DBE) by Queen Elizabeth II.

Death 
Fields' health declined in July 1979, when she contracted pneumonia after performing an open-air concert on the Royal Yacht which was docked in Capri's harbour. After a spell in hospital, she seemed to be recovering, but died on 27 September 1979. The press reported she died holding her husband's hand, but in reality he was at their Anacapri home at the time, while Gracie was home with the housekeeper, Irena. She is buried in Capri's Protestant Cemetery, in a white marble tomb. Her coffin was carried by staff from her restaurant.

Honours and popular culture
Fields was appointed Commander of the Order of the British Empire in the 1938 New Years Honours. In February 1979, she was invested as a Dame Commander of the Order of the British Empire seven months before her death at her home on Capri, aged 81.

Fields was the mystery guest on the 1 May 1955 edition of What's My Line? After Bennett Cerf asked about one of her songs, Dorothy Kilgallen correctly guessed it was her. Fields was granted the Freedom of Rochdale. The local theatre in Rochdale, the Gracie Fields Theatre, was opened by her in 1978.

Following her death, she was referenced in the 1987 film Wish You Were Here, the 1996 film Intimate Relations, and the 2006 film The History Boys.

In early 1985, an episode of the BBC television series Halls of Fame, which presented a nostalgic look at various famous regional theatres, included a medley of Fields' songs at the Palace Theatre, Manchester, sung by Marti Webb. At the 1985 Royal Variety Performance, Su Pollard performed "Sally" in tribute to her. The following year's Performance also featured a section with a medley of Fields' songs, again sung by Webb.

On 3 October 2009, the final train to run on the Oldham Loop before it closed to be converted to a tramway, a Class 156, was named in her honour. In September 2016, a statue of Fields was unveiled outside Rochdale Town Hall, which was the first statue of a woman to be erected for over a century in Lancashire.

Gracie! was a 2009 biopic TV film on her life, with Jane Horrocks playing Fields and Tom Hollander her husband Monty Banks. It covers her career before the Second World War and the decline in her popularity during the war.

Notable songs

 "We're All living at the Cloisters"
 "You Didn't Want Me When You Had Me"
 "Sally"
 "The Kerry Dance"
 "Sing As We Go" 
 "Thing-Ummy-Bob (That's Gonna Win The War)"
 "The Biggest Aspidistra in the World"
 "Three Green Bonnets"
 "I Took my Harp to a Party"
 "The Trek Song"
 "Pedro the Fisherman"
 "Only a Glass of Champagne"
 "Speak Softly, Love"
 "Angels Guard Thee"
 "Around the World"
 "Nuns' Chorus"
 "Little Donkey"
 "Now Is the Hour" 
 "The Carefree Heart"
 "The Isle of Capri"
 "The Woodpecker Song"
 "Walter, Walter (Lead Me to the Altar)"
 "Young at Heart"
 "Christopher Robin is Saying His Prayers"
 "Far Away"
 "If I Had a Talking Picture of You"
 "Home"
 "Wish Me Luck as You Wave Me Goodbye"
 "The Holy City"
 "When I Grow Too Old to Dream"
 "If I Knew You Were Comin' I'd've Baked a Cake"
 "The Twelfth of Never"
 "Those Were The Days" (performed live at The Batley Variety Club in 1968)
 "Singin' in the Bathtub"
 "Stop and Shop at the Co-op Shop"
 "I Never Cried So Much in All My Life"
 "Take Me To Your Heart" (alternative English lyrics to "La Vie en rose")

Filmography

Box office ranking
For a number of years, British film exhibitors voted her among the top ten stars in Britain at the box office via an annual poll in the Motion Picture Herald.
1936 – 1st (3rd most popular star over all)
1937 – 1st (3rd overall)
1938 – 2nd
1939 - 2nd
1940 - 3rd
1941 - 8th

References

Sources
 
Lassandro, Sebastian (2019). Pride of Our Alley, vol 1 and 2. Bear Manor Media. 
Lassandro, Sebastian (2020). Gracie's War. Independently published. 
Gracie Fields: The Authorised Biography (1995) by David Bret
"Gracie Fields" by Jeffrey Richards in the Oxford Dictionary of National Biography

Further reading

 – Paperback 

 (First published 1991)
 – Paperback 
 – Paperback . Digitalised 2002

 (First published 1938)

External links

The Official Dame Gracie Fields website
Gracie Fields at Turner Classic Movies
Gracie Fields: A Biography by Joan Moules
Photographs and literature
Nine digitally restored Gracie Fields recordings
Gracie Fields and Thomas Thompson
Gracie Fields interview on Parkinson, 05/11/1977

1898 births
1979 deaths
20th-century English actresses
Actresses awarded damehoods
Actresses from Lancashire
Dames Commander of the Order of the British Empire
Deaths from pneumonia in Campania
English comedy musicians
English expatriates in Italy
English expatriates in the United States
English film actresses
English Protestants
English television actresses
English women comedians
Music hall performers
Musicians from Lancashire
People from Rochdale
 Actors from Rochdale
Singers awarded knighthoods
20th-century English singers
20th-century English comedians
British comedy actresses
20th-century English women singers
British novelty song performers
People from Peacehaven